Liu Jianfeng may refer to:

 Liu Jianfeng (Tang dynasty) (劉建鋒; died 896), Tang dynasty warlord
 Liu Jianfeng (PRC) (刘剑锋; born 1936), PRC Governor of Hainan